Americana (formerly known as National Anthem) is a 2023 American crime thriller film, written and directed by Tony Tost. It stars Sydney Sweeney, Paul Walter Hauser, Halsey, Eric Dane, Zahn McClarnon, Gavin Maddox Bergman, Simon Rex, Derek Hinkey, Toby Huss and Harriet Sansom Harris.

It had its world premiere at South by Southwest on March 17, 2023.

Cast
 Sydney Sweeney as Penny Jo Poplin
 Paul Walter Hauser as Lefty Ledbetter
 Halsey as Mandy Starr
 Eric Dane as Dillon MacIntosh 
 Zahn McClarnon as Ghost Eye
 Gavin Maddox Bergman as Cal Starr
 Simon Rex as Roy Lee Dean
 Derek Hinkey as Hank Spears
 Toby Huss as Pendleton Duvall
 Harriet Sansom Harris as Tish
 Donald Cerrone as Sheriff Cole Pickering

Production
In February 2022, Sydney Sweeney, Paul Walter Hauser, Halsey, Simon Rex, Gavin Maddox Bergman, Harriet Sansom Harris, Derek Hinkey, Eric Dane, Zahn McClarnon and Donald Cerrone joined the cast of the film, with Tony Tost directing from a screenplay he wrote.

Principal photography began in February 2022, in New Mexico.

Release
It had its world premiere at South by Southwest on March 17, 2023.

References

External links
 

2023 films
American crime thriller films
2023 directorial debut films
Bron Studios films